Arcalod is a mountain of Savoie, France.

It is the 4th most prominent peak in the French Alps.

See also
List of Alpine peaks by prominence

References

Mountains of Savoie
Mountains of the Alps